Central American migrant caravans, also known as the  ("Migrant's Way of the Cross"), are migrant caravans that travel from Central America to the Mexico–United States border.

There is some disagreement as to whether the migrant caravans are primarily composed of refugees seeking asylum or are merely large concentrations of traditional economic migrants. Numerous human rights organizations document the increase in violence and abuse in recent years in Central American countries. A report by the Geneva Declaration on Armed Violence and Development, cited by Amnesty International, noted that between 2007 and 2012, several Central American countries had the highest average annual female homicide rates in the world, although the average annual male homicide rates in the world are higher. Other studies of the composition of the caravans indicated that the caravans more resemble traditional economic migrants. The causes of the migration, as well as the proper way to settle or deport the migrants themselves, remains a source of political debate within the U.S.

Causes of the migration
Drought and crop failure in the Central American dry corridor and climate change in Honduras have been factors in the formation of the caravans.
Honduras is one of the poorest and most violent countries in Central America. The country experienced a coup d'état in 2009 and is one of the most unequal countries in the world, while the poverty rate stood at 64.3% in 2018. Drought and crop failure is also one of the causes of emigration.

According to the newspaper Le Monde, "Caught between extreme poverty and ultra-violence, more and more Hondurans are choosing to flee their country, driven by the most extreme despair". An opposition Honduran politician considers that migrants "do not run after the American dream, they flee the Honduran nightmare".

First caravans
Discussions of illegal immigration typically claim that there have been many caravans. Those that antedate 2017 were small affairs that did not move as a group to the U.S. border.

2017 caravan
Pueblo Sin Fronteras supported its first Holy Week caravan in 2017.

On 25 March 2018, a group of about 700 migrants (80% from Honduras) began their way north from Tapachula. By 1 April, the caravan had arrived in Matías Romero, Oaxaca, and grown to about 1,200 people. In mid-April, 500 migrants continued northward from Mexico City—the caravan's last official stop—toward Tijuana, in separate groups riding atop freight train cars. Two busloads of the migrants arrived in Tijuana on 25 April and a further four busloads were making their way from Hermosillo.

More than 150 migrants prepared to seek asylum from United States immigration officials. United States Attorney General Jeff Sessions called the caravan "a deliberate attempt to undermine our laws and overwhelm our system". On 30 April, Sessions' Justice Department announced criminal charges against eleven people for crossing the border illegally.

American aid worker Scott Warren with the organization No More Deaths was arrested on 12 May on charges of illegally harboring people in the country, hours after releasing a report accusing the U.S. Border Patrol of tampering with water sources for migrants crossing the Arizona desert. He pleaded not guilty and was ultimately acquitted in November 2019.

Late 2018 caravan

Migrants from Honduras, Guatemala, Nicaragua, and El Salvador gathered on 12 October to meet at San Pedro Sula, the second largest city in Honduras. The caravan began the next day, intending to reach the United States to flee from violence, poverty, and political repression. The caravan began with about 160 migrants but quickly gathered over 500 participants as it marched through Honduras. Bartolo Fuentes, a former Honduran congressman and one of the march coordinators, stated that the goal of the caravan was to find safety in numbers as it traveled north. Though he was at first convinced that the caravan was a spontaneous movement, Fuentes has since told several news agencies that the caravan was organized and popularized through a faked social media account bearing his own name and photograph, which has since been deleted from Facebook. Fuentes says he first heard about the fake account from Irineo Mujica of the organization Pueblo Sin Fronteras. The same day it left, United States Vice President Mike Pence urged the presidents of Honduras, El Salvador, and Guatemala to persuade their citizens to stay home. Honduran President Juan Orlando Hernández advised his citizens to return home and to "not let yourselves be used for political purposes". Pueblo Sin Fronteras did not organize the October caravan, but expressed its solidarity with it. Irineo Mujico, the director of Pueblo Sin Fronteras, did not himself recommend another caravan to the United States, instead advising its members to seek asylum in Mexico.

As the caravan passed through the Guatemalan city of Chiquimula, Fuentes was arrested by police and deported. Other Hondurans, traveling on buses, had their papers seized or were arrested, forcing migrants to travel on foot. On entering Tecún Umán on 18 October 2018, the caravan numbered around 5,000, but began shrinking due to the speed of parts of the caravan and its reception in shelters in Tecún Umán. The same day, U.S. President Donald Trump threatened to deploy the U.S. military and close the U.S.–Mexico border to keep the caravan from entering the country. Trump also threatened to cut aid to countries allowing the caravans to pass through. Also on 18 October, Mexico flew two Boeing 727s transporting Federal Police officers to the Guatemala–Mexico border. The next day, 19 October, an estimated 4,000 migrants had gathered in Ciudad Tecún Umán in Guatemala. Mexican officials, including the ambassador to Guatemala, requested that migrants appear individually at the border for processing. The migrants ignored the request, and marched on the bridge, overwhelming Guatemalan police and Mexican barriers on the bridge, then entered Ciudad Hidalgo, Chiapas, and encountered Federal Police in riot gear. After an hour-long standoff with police, whom migrants threw shoes and stones at, tear gas was used to push the migrants back onto the bridge. Officials reported that at least six Mexican police officers had been injured. After hostilities ended, migrants formed into lines and began processing by Mexican authorities. By the mid-afternoon, migrants were allowed entry in Mexico and were taken by bus to Tapachula. According to the Commissioner of the Federal Police, Manelich Castilla Craviotto, this was for processing and shelter. Migrants with valid visas and documentation were allowed immediate entrance, while asylum-seekers would be detained in a migration center for 45 days. On 20 October, about 2,000 migrants who had crossed the Suchiate River and entered Ciudad Hidalgo decided to rebuild the caravan to continue their trek to the United States. The caravan again resumed its march early on 21 October from Tapachula. A force of 700 Federal Police officers, mostly women, formed a human barricade on the Suchiate–Tapachula highway, but withdrew as the 5,000-strong caravan of migrants came within . By the afternoon, the migrants reached Tapachula and its leaders decided to rest there,  inside Mexico. Simultaneously, Guatemalan officials reported that another thousand migrants entered the country from Honduras, while another 1,000 migrants were reported making for Tapachula from Ciudad Hidalgo.

Irineo Mujica was arrested in Ciudad Hidalgo on 22 October while walking with a group of migrants to a church. Mujica was pulled out of a crowd of migrants by Mexican authorities and pushed into a white van. According to Pueblo Sin Fronteras, he was not involved in organizing the caravan and was conducting humanitarian work in Tapachula. Mujica has since claimed that he and Pueblo Sin Fronteras were initially opposed to the timing of this migrant caravan, because they believed it would be used to build anti-immigration sentiment during the 2018 US midterm election.

Also on 22 October, President Donald Trump said the U.S. would begin curtailing tens of millions of dollars in aid to three Central American nations, because they did not stop the caravan. President Trump also threatened to send the U.S. military to close the border and stop the caravan. On 26 October, when the caravan was in the Arriaga Municipality of the state of Chiapas, Mexican President Enrique Peña Nieto unveiled his program entitled "Estás en tu casa" ("You are at home"). This initiative allows caravan migrants meeting certain criteria to receive benefits and begin to normalize their immigration status in Mexico. Migrants who follow Mexican laws and are granted refugee status will, according to the plan, be entitled to temporary work permits and IDs, medical attention, housing in local establishments, and schooling for children. In order to qualify, however, migrants must agree to settle in the states of Chiapas or Oaxaca and not continue to move north.

As the second caravan entered Mexico on 30 October, the main body of some 4,000 migrants, at Santiago Niltepec, demanded "safe and dignified" transportation to Mexico City. Migrants still crossing into Mexico over the Suchiate river were dissuaded by Mexican helicopters and police.

Some scientists contend that the impact of climate change is causing crop failures and exacerbating poverty in Central America, thereby creating what the United Nations High Commissioner for Refugees has called "climate refugees." According to Robert Albro, a researcher at the Center for Latin American and Latino Studies at American University, "The main reason people are moving is because they don't have anything to eat. This has a strong link to climate change – we are seeing tremendous climate instability that is radically changing food security in the region."

Table

Border actions

A week before the 2018 midterm elections, the US Government sent 5,200 active-duty soldiers to the US-Mexico border to "harden" it further. 2,100 National Guard troops were already present.

On November 23, mayor of Tijuana Juan Manuel Gastélum declared a "humanitarian crisis" in response to the large number of migrants in the city. By this date, over 5,000 members of the caravan were staying at the Tijuana Stadium— a structure with a capacity of 3,000.

On November 25, a group of approximately 500 migrants marched to the San Ysidro Port of Entry to demand answers. Frustrated by the slow pace of asylum application processing (approximately 60 per day) and the dire living conditions in their tent cities, they attempted to bypass the Mexican Federal Police to reach the border wall when a commotion occurred. A member of the caravan was caught on video throwing rocks at border agents while at the border wall. In response, the United States Border Patrol launched tear gas over the border at the group, which included women and children, and subsequently shut down the crossing for six hours.  Photographs of the incident received significant media attention and sparked extensive international commentary. 42 migrants were arrested, and a total of 4 Border agents were struck by rocks.

Political reaction in the U.S.
In the United States, the migrant caravan was a major issue for President Donald Trump and other Republicans and conservatives in the 2018 mid-term elections. Immigrant invasion rhetoric was used by conservative commentators on Fox News. The caravan was described as an "invading horde" by Laura Ingraham, an "invasion" by Steve Doocy, "a full-scale invasion by a hostile force" by Michelle Malkin, "a criminal involvement on the part of these leftist mobs" and "a highly organized, very elaborate sophisticated operation" by Chris Farrell. According to closed captioning transcripts, the word "invasion" was used in relation to the caravan more than 60 times on Fox News in October 2018 and more than 75 times on Fox Business. Commentators noted that mentions of the caravan by Fox News dropped dramatically immediately following the 2018 midterm elections.

Disinformation was promoted by Trump and supporters including the claim that there were "criminals and unknown Middle Easterners" in the caravan, despite the lack of any publicized evidence for this charge. Likewise, Vice President Pence in an interview with Fox News stated:

The president of Honduras at the time, Juan Orlando Hernández, was a member of the right-wing National party and an opponent of the Venezuelan government led by Nicolás Maduro.

The Twitter account of the Department of Homeland Security "confirmed" that within the caravan there were people who are "gang members or have significant criminal histories," but did not offer any evidence of ties. The National Rifle Association's NRATV alleged that "a bevy of left-wing groups" were working with George Soros and the Venezuelan government "to try to influence the 2018 midterms by sending Honduran migrants north in the thousands".

On November 2, 2018, five days before the election, the Department of Homeland Security website issued a press release, "Myth vs. Fact: Caravan", stating that "over 270 individuals along the caravan route have criminal histories, including known gang membership". It cited no sources for the specific numbers and crimes claimed, but did cite Mexican officials to back up their claim that the caravan contained criminal groups. The DHS also claimed the caravan contained migrants from Afghanistan, Somalia, India and Bangladesh, though they didn't cite any sources.

One study by the National Center for Risk and Economic Analysis of Terrorism Events (CREATE) at the University of Southern California and the Institute for Defense Analyses stated that the Central American immigrants the U.S. and claiming asylum had more in common with economic migrants than traditional refugees. Both groups receive funding or sponsorship from the US government.

Reactions in Mexico
Mexican President Andrés Manuel López Obrador said: "Obviously, we have to help because Central American migrants pass through our territory and we have to bring order to this migration, make sure it's legal."

Initially positive, the Mexican public's sentiment soured rapidly. El Universal October 2018 survey found that 64.5% of the Mexican public believed that Central American migrants increased violence or unemployment; this figure increased to 73% in the following month's survey. 56% of the public believed that López Obrador needs to be "tougher" on future migrants.

The 2019 survey found that 58% of Mexican respondents oppose migration from Central America.

Late 2020 caravans
As the United States prepared for elections in 2020 unknown groups promoted messages on social media sites for another caravan.

In October 2020, migrant caravans from Honduras have been either intercepted by Guatemalan Army officers and deported back to Honduras upon reaching the border crossings, or some of them have evaded border restrictions and reached Guatemala City, with intent to continuing their journey to Mexico. The Mexican military and border police have repeatedly warned that no migrant caravans will be allowed to cross into Mexico.

Early 2021 caravans
After Joe Biden won the 2020 United States presidential election, there was a resurgence in migrant caravan activities. Fox News has claimed this to be related to Biden's planned amnesty for illegal immigrants within his first 100 days in office.

On January 13, just one week prior to the Joe Biden's presidential inauguration, more than 3,000 people departed Honduras and El Salvador for the United States. That number grew to approximately 7,000-8,000 one week later.

On January 16, Guatemala and Mexico deployed the military to their borders, in an attempt to stop the migrant caravan from transiting through their countries on the way to the United States. Three days later, the migrant caravans reportedly dissolved in the Guatemalan-Honduran border region, and most its participants were deported back to Honduras.

2022 caravans
From June 2022, up to 15,000 migrants, mostly from Central America and Venezuela, started to set out from the southern Mexico city of Tapachula in a caravan bound to the United States.  On 5 July, a caravan of almost 7,000 people departed from Tapachula. They broke up in Huixtla after two days.

On 11 December 2022, a migrant caravan of over 1,000 people crossed illegally into El Paso from Ciudad Juarez.

See also 

 2014 American immigration crisis
 Asylum in the United States
 Brooks County, Texas
 European migrant crisis
 Illegal immigration to the United States
 List of Mexico–United States border crossings
 The Mariel boatlift
 Mexico–United States border crisis
 Missing in Brooks County
 Operation Faithful Patriot
 El tren de la muerte
 Vietnamese boat people

References

Further reading

External links 
 Map: From Africa to Tijuana 
via: São Paulo, crossing the Darién Gap on foot, across the Rio Suchiate to Tapachula, and to Tijuana. 
at: 

Protests in Mexico
Illegal immigration to the United States
Immigration to Mexico
International volunteer organizations
2018 in international relations
2018 in Mexico
2018 in American politics
Immigration policy of Donald Trump
Mexico–United States relations
Mexico–United States border
Honduras–United States relations
Northern Triangle refugee crisis
Guatemalan emigrants to the United States
Honduran emigrants to the United States
Salvadoran emigrants to the United States
2018 in North America
2018 in Central America
2017 in North America
2017 in Central America